Melody Diachun is a Canadian singer and songwriter and Canadian National Jazz Awards' nominee for Female Vocalist of the Year in 2009. Recordings include "Get Back to the Groove", which charted at No. 9 on !earshot's National Jazz Chart, "Melody Diachun EQ" and "Metaphora" by Altered Laws featuring The Babayaga String Quartet and Melody Diachun which won 'Outstanding Jazz Album' of 2008 at the Western Canadian Music Awards and was nominated for a JUNO for 'Contemporary Jazz Album of the Year' in 2008. In 2018, Diachun was nominated for 'Artist of the Year' and her single "That's What Delete Is For" was nominated for 'Best Blues Song' at the 2018 Kootenay Music Awards. In 2019, Diachun was nominated for 'Artist of the Year', her song "Get Back to the Groove" was nominated in the Rhythm And Blues category, and her song "High Definition Love" was nominated in the Pop category at the 2019 Kootenay Music Awards.

Biography
Diachun was born in 1968 in Montréal, Québec and raised in Annapolis Royal, Nova Scotia. Singing from an early age accompanied by her father, a part-time singer and piano player, she began piano lessons at age 6 and played French horn and electric bass through junior and senior high school. At age 15 she took her first professional singing gig. At age 17 Diachun moved back to Montréal to attend McGilll University where she was the first vocalist admitted to the school's Jazz Performance Program. Diachun earned her Bachelor of Music degree "with distinction" in Jazz Voice in 1994. After university, Diachun moved to New York City to study briefly with jazz vocalist Sheila Jordan under a grant from the Canada Council for the Arts.

In 1997, Diachun moved to Western Canada and began a long-term house gig at the Banff Springs Hotel where she met her future husband, guitarist and bassist Doug Stephenson. From 2000 to 2012 Diachun worked as a freelance vocalist in Vancouver, British Columbia. In 2012, Diachun began teaching at the Contemporary Music & Technology Program at Selkirk College in Nelson, British Columbia. She took on the role of School Chair of the School of the Arts at Selkirk College in August 2022.

Discography
 Melody Diachun/Bob Murphy/Doug Stephenson, "Lullaby of the Leaves", 2002
 Melody Diachun, "Dreams & Places", 2006
 Kris feat. Melody Diachun, Johanna Sillanpa, and Roger Audio,"Truth Be Told", 2006
 Altered Laws featuring the Babayaga String Quartet and Melody Diachun, "Metaphora", 2007, Artist Jazz Records
 Melody Diachun, "EQ", 2008, Cellar Live
 Melody Diachun, "Get Back to the Groove", Third Beach Records
 Melody Diachun, "Winter Wonderland" (single), 2020, Third Beach Records
 Tom Keenlyside Quartet "A Night at the Espresso" (album), 2022, Cellar Live
 Melody Diachun, "Sumner's Tales: The Music Of Sting",2022, Third Beach Records

References

External links
 Official site

1968 births
Living people
Canadian women jazz singers
Canadian jazz songwriters
Canadian women singer-songwriters
20th-century Canadian women singers
21st-century Canadian women singers
Singers from Montreal